The International Art Colony "Ramazzotti" is an annual art colony held at the lakeside city of Ohrid in North Macedonia. The colony runs every August for up to 20 invited artists. The colony attracts artists from all of Europe and North America and finishes with an exhibition of the artists' work. The colony runs similar to many other East European art colonies, forming a mixture of sculptors, painters, wood carvers and photographers. The colony was founded in 2003 by Zoran and Blagorodna Josifov from Kavadarci of Macedonia.

Artists attending the 2008 colony were: 

Jure Cekuta, Slovenia
John Chapman, USA
Gligor Chemerski, Macedonia
Robert Cvetkovski, Macedonia
Marija Dakovic, Bosnia
Jovica Dejanovich, Serbia
Dragan Dejanovich, Serbia
Barbra Demshar, Serbia
Desislava Deneva, Bulgaria
Simonida Filipovska-Kitanovska, Macedonia
Zhaneta Gelevska-Veljanovska, Macedonia-England
Maja Dzartovska-Hill, England
Ben Hill, England
Ilija Kochovski, Macedonia
Jana Kunovska, Macedonia
Kasiopeja Naumovska, Macedonia
Tome Mishev, Macedonia
Dragan Radenović, Serbia
Emil Shulajkovski, Macedonia
Ilija Spasovski-Chendo, Macedonia

References 

Arts festivals in North Macedonia
Macedonian art
Ohrid
Summer events in North Macedonia